Mastic Beach is a hamlet and census-designated place, and former village in the southeastern part of the Town of Brookhaven in Suffolk County, on Long Island, in New York, United States. The population was 14,849 at the 2010 census, when it was an unincorporated census-designated place for the first time.

History 

In 2010, a group of residents sought to incorporate Mastic Beach as a village. Petitioners blamed the town of Brookhaven for not doing enough code enforcement on blighted streets and eyesore buildings, believing more diligent code enforcement under village control would improve the community aesthetics. Opponents were concerned that creating the village would increase taxes, and that estimates for the proposed village's total budget were low. At $549,500 annually, the village would take up building code enforcement, leaving police, fire, and sanitation to Brookhaven.

After a vote on August 31, 2010, incorporation was approved. The proposed incorporation needed to be passed by a majority in order for the hamlet to become a village. The first elected mayor was Paul Breschard.

The boundaries of the village of Mastic Beach differed from those of the previous census-designated place (CDP). The village did not include the William Floyd House grounds as well as a few blocks in the extreme southwest of the CDP, but it added several blocks west of Mastic Road and Commack Road.

Dissolution
Residents voted 1,922 to 1,215 on November 8, 2016, to revert to an unincorporated area with services handled by the Town of Brookhaven. The decision to dissolve the village was decided upon due to political issues and fiscal concerns.

A formal dissolution plan was developed over several months and approved by the Village Board (4–1) at a special meeting on March 16, 2017. The dissolution took place on January 1, 2018.

Geography

Nearby are Smith Point County Park and the Fire Island National Seashore. It is on a peninsula extending into Moriches Bay.

Mastic Beach is located in the Forge River–Moriches Bay Watershed, and is located within the larger Long Island Sound/Atlantic Ocean Watershed.

Demographics
As of the census of 2000, there were 11,543 people, 3,755 households, and 2,793 families residing in the CDP. The population density was 2,727.9 per square mile (1,053.6/km2). There were 4,375 housing units at an average density of 1,033.9/sq mi (399.3/km2). The racial makeup of the CDP was 88.16% White, 5.02% African American, 0.49% Native American, 0.91% Asian, 0.01% Pacific Islander, 2.64% from other races, and 2.77% from two or more races. Hispanic or Latino of any race were 10.59% of the population.

There were 3,755 households, out of which 42.6% had children under the age of 18 living with them, 51.3% were married couples living together, 16.1% had a female householder with no husband present, and 25.6% were non-families. 18.4% of all households were made up of individuals, and 6.3% had someone living alone who was 65 years of age or older. The average household size was 3.07 and the average family size was 3.49.

In the CDP, the population was spread out, with 31.8% under the age of 18, 8.5% from 18 to 24, 32.4% from 25 to 44, 19.7% from 45 to 64, and 7.5% who were 65 years of age or older. The median age was 32 years. For every 100 females, there were 99.8 males. For every 100 females age 18 and over, there were 96.4 males.

The median income for a household in the CDP was $44,937, and the median income for a family was $49,219. Males had a median income of $37,871 versus $27,853 for females. The per capita income for the CDP was $17,046. About 9.2% of families and 11.3% of the population were below the poverty threshold, including 14.3% of those under age 18 and 8.1% of those age 65 or over.

Education 
Mastic Beach is served by the William Floyd School District.

Media 
Tri Hamlet News, online news for Mastic • Shirley • Moriches

Notable people 
Kim Barnes Arico, born in Mastic Beach
Joe Smith Jr., boxer, former light heavyweight world champion

References

External links
Mastic Beach Property Owners Association

Brookhaven, New York
Former census-designated places in New York (state)
Populated places disestablished in 2017
Populated coastal places in New York (state)
Former villages in New York (state)